Sant'Elena may refer to:

 Sant'Elena (island), an island of Venice, Italy 
 Sant'Elena, Rome, a church in Rome, Italy
 Sant'Elena, Venice, a Gothic-style, Roman Catholic church in Venice, Italy.
 Sant'Elena, Veneto, a comune in the Province of Padua in the Italian region Veneto, Italy
 Sant'Elena Sannita, a comune in the Province of Isernia in the Italian region Molise, Italy

See also 
 Santa Elena (disambiguation)